Igor Semenovich Lyakin-Frolov (born 10 September 1948) is a Russian diplomat.

Biography
Lyakin-Frolov worked in the Soviet foreign ministry from 1978 until 1991, then in the Russian foreign ministry from 1992 to 1995. Since then, he has held the positions of Ambassador of Russia to Burundi from 1995 to 1999, ambassador to Botswana from 2003 to 2005, the Permanent Plenipotentiary to the Collective Security Treaty Organization from 2010 to 2013, and the ambassador to Tajikistan from 2013 to 2022.

References

1948 births

Living people
Ambassadors of Russia to Tajikistan
Ambassadors of Russia to Botswana
Ambassadors of Russia to Burundi
Recipients of the Order of Honour (Russia)
Moscow State Institute of International Relations alumni